Oenopota gilpini is a species of sea snail, a marine gastropod mollusk in the family Mangeliidae.

This species is considered a nomen dubium.

Description
Th length of the shell attains 6.5 mm. Last whorl occupies about two thirds of shell height (range 56-75 %). Size: Up to 12 x 5 mm

Distribution
This marine species occurs in the Bay of Fundy, Nova Scotia, Canada.

References

 Verkruzen, T. A. 1878. Zur Fauna von Neu-Schotland (Nova Scotia) und Neufundland Jahrbücher der Deutschen Malakozoologischen Gesellschaft 5 208–230.

External links
 

gilpini
Gastropods described in 1878